Berthold Litzmann (18 April 1857 – 14 October 1926) was a professor of German studies and a literature historian. He was a professor at the University of Bonn and the founder of the Society for Literature History, which also included Thomas Mann.

He is known as the author of a three part biography of Clara Schumann.

Litzmann was born in Kiel, the son of Carl Conrad Theodor Litzmann. He died in Munich.

Works 

 Clara Schumann. Ein Künstlerleben. Nach Tagebüchern und Briefen. 3 Volumes. Breitkopf & Härtel, Leipzig 1920.
 Ludwig Schröder. Ein Beitrag zur deutschen Litteratur- und Theatergeschichte. 2 Parts. Voß, Hamburg/Leipzig 1890–1894.
 Goethes Faust. Eine Einführung. Fleischel, Berlin 1904.
 Das Tragische in Gerhart Hauptmanns Dramen (= Mitteilungen der Literarhistorischen Gesellschaft Bonn. Jg. 3 Nr. 6, 1908). Ruhfus, Dortmund 1908.

References 

1857 births
1926 deaths
German literary historians